The women's tournament in volleyball at the 2012 Olympic Games in London was the 13th edition of the event in an Olympic Games, organised by the world's governing body, the FIVB, in conjunction with the IOC. It was held at Earls Court Exhibition Centre from 28 July to 11 August 2012.

Qualification

Pools composition
Teams were seeded following the Serpentine system according to their ranking as of 15 January 2012.

Twelve qualified nations were drawn into two groups, each consisting of six teams. After a robin-round, the four highest-placed teams in each group advanced to a knock-out round to decide the medals.

Rosters

Preliminary round
Teams played a round-robin schedule within the pool and those with the top four point totals advanced to a knockout round. Teams were awarded three points for a 3–0 or 3–1 win, two points for a 3–2 win, one point for a 3–2 loss, and zero points for a 3–0 or 3–1 loss. If at the end of pool play teams are tied the tiebreakers are (1) most wins, (2) set win ratio, (3) points ratio, and (4) head-to-head. If three or more teams are tied, the tiebreakers are applied only to the matches between tied teams.

All times are British Summer Time (UTC+01:00).

Pool A

|}

Pool B

|}

Knockout stage
All times are British Summer Time (UTC+01:00).

Bracket

Quarterfinals

|}

Semifinals

|}

Bronze medal match

|}

Final

|}

Statistics leaders
Only players whose teams advanced to the semifinals are ranked.

Source:

Final standings

Medalists

Individual awards
Most Valuable Player
 

Best Scorer
 

Best Spiker
 

Best Blocker
 

Best Server
 

Best Setter
 

Best Receiver
 

Best Libero

See also
Volleyball at the 2012 Summer Olympics – Men's tournament

References

External links
Official website of the 2012 Olympic volleyball tournaments

Olympics
Women's indoor
2012 in women's volleyball
2012 in English women's sport
Women's events at the 2012 Summer Olympics